Shinshō (真紹) (797–873) was a Japanese Buddhist monk of the Shingon sect and founder of the Eikan-dō Zenrin-ji in Heian-kyō (modern Kyoto).

He studied Vajrayana - or Esoteric - buddhism under Kūkai (Kōbō Daishi) at the Tō-ji and became the third master of Shingon in 843. Rising to a higher position in the Tō-ji in 847, he then founded the Eikan-dō Zenrin-ji in 853.

References
Frederic, Louis (2002). "Shinsho." Japan Encyclopedia. Cambridge, Massachusetts: Harvard University Press.

797 births
873 deaths
Japanese Buddhist clergy
Japanese religious leaders
Shingon Buddhism
Shingon Buddhist monks
Heian period Buddhist clergy